Valborg is a feminine given name. People with the name include:

Given name
 Valborg Aulin (1860–1928), Swedish pianist and composer
 Valborg Borchsenius (1872–1949), Danish ballet dancer 
 Valborg Christensen (1917–2003), Danish swimmer
 Valborg Eriksdotter (1545–1580), royal mistress of Magnus, Duke of Östergötland
 Valborg Fleming (died after 1542), Finnish abbess
 Valborg Florström (1878–1956), Finnish diver
 Valborg Hammerich (1897–1988), Danish philanthropist
 Valborg Innamaa (before 1550–c. 1602), Finnish merchant and ship owner 
 Valborg Lerche (1873–1931), Norwegian social worker
 Valborg Lindahl, Swedish figure skater 
 Valborg Madslien, Norwegian ski-orienteer
 Valborg Olander (1861–1943, Stockholm), Swedish teacher, politician and suffragette
 Valborg Stoud Platou (1881–1960), Norwegian judge and attorney
 Valborg Svensson (1903–1983), Swedish politician and journalist
 Valborg Werbeck-Svärdström (1879–1972), Swedish singer

Middle name
 Aud Valborg Tønnessen (born 1964), Norwegian Lutheran theologian and church historian
 Dagny Valborg Carlsson (1912–2022), Swedish blogger and influencer

Fictional characters
 Valborg, main character in the Danish tragedy by Adam Oehlenschläger entitled Axel and Valborg

Swedish feminine given names
Finnish feminine given names
Norwegian feminine given names
Danish feminine given names